Colonel James "Rhodey" Rhodes, sometimes referred to by his alias, War Machine, and briefly Iron Patriot, is a fictional character primarily portrayed by Don Cheadle (initially by Terrence Howard) in the Marvel Cinematic Universe (MCU) media franchise, based on the Marvel Comics character of the same name. He is depicted as a U.S. Air Force officer who is the best friend of technological savant Tony Stark. He becomes involved in Stark's heroic efforts, later gaining armor like that of Stark's Iron Man persona, but with heavier weaponry, and becoming a member of the Avengers.

Rhodes first appeared in the 2008 film Iron Man and has since become a central figure in the MCU. As of 2021, he has appeared in eight films, as well as the Disney+ series The Falcon and the Winter Soldier (2021) and the animated series What If...? (2021) as an alternate version. Rhodes is set to return in the upcoming series Secret Invasion (2023), with his story in the show leading into the film Armor Wars (TBA), in which Rhodes will serve as the main protagonist.

Character creation, characterization, and appearances
The character of James "Rhodey" Rhodes first appeared in Iron Man #118, in January 1979. In Iron Man #170, in May 1983, Rhodes became Iron Man for a time. Other variations of the character debuted later, with an up-armored Rhodes becoming known as War Machine in Iron Man #282, in July 1992, and as Iron Patriot in Gambit #13, in May 2013. In the mid-2000s, with a number of movies having been made from other Marvel properties licensed to other studios, Kevin Feige realized that Marvel still owned the rights to the core members of the Avengers, which included those from Iron Man's supporting characters. Feige, a self-professed "fanboy", envisioned creating a shared universe just as creators Stan Lee and Jack Kirby had done with their comic books in the early 1960s.

Casting
Terrence Howard was contracted to play Rhodes in the 2008 film Iron Man. Howard was signed on before any of the other major actors and was the highest paid actor in the film. Favreau cast Howard because he felt he could play War Machine in a sequel. Howard prepared for the role by visiting Nellis Air Force Base on March 16, 2007, where he ate with the pilots and observed HH-60 Pave Hawk rescue helicopters and F-22 Raptors.

Howard and his father are Iron Man fans, partly because Rhodes was one of the few black superheroes when he was a child. He was a Downey fan since he saw him in Weird Science, and the two competed physically on set.

Entertainment Weekly reported that Howard was offered a 50 to 80 percent pay cut for Iron Man 2, though it said that it was unclear whether Howard turned down the role or whether Marvel withdrew their offer. Following the contract dispute between Howard and Marvel Studios, Don Cheadle was cast to portray War Machine, and Cheadle has portrayed the character for the rest of his MCU appearances. Isaac Perlmutter, who had previously overseen the development of Marvel Studios, was alleged to have been removed from that position in part due to replacing Howard with  Cheadle on the grounds that black people "look the same". A person with knowledge of his creative approach said, however, that Perlmutter "neither discriminates nor cares about diversity, he just cares about what he thinks will make money".

Cheadle only had a few hours to accept the role and did not even know what storyline Rhodes would undergo. He commented that he is a comic book fan, but had not previously participated in comics-themed films due to the scarcity of black superheroes. Cheadle said he thought Iron Man was a robot before the first film came out.

Characterization

A friend of Stark's and the liaison between Stark Industries and the United States Air Force in the department of acquisitions, specifically weapons development. He holds the rank of lieutenant colonel in the United States Air Force and acts as the military's chief liaison to Stark Industries' weapons division, and is initially oblivious to Obadiah Stane's actions. While Rhodes is roguish in the comics after he met Stark, his earlier disciplinarian character forms a dynamic with Stark, and he is unsure whether or not Stark's actions are acceptable. "Rhodey is completely disgusted with the way Tony has lived his life, but at a certain point he realizes that perhaps there is a different way", Howard said. "Whose life is the right way; is it the strict military life, or the life of an independent?"

On how he approached his character in Iron Man 2, Cheadle stated "I go, what's the common denominator here? And the common denominator was really his friendship with Tony, and that's what we really tried to track in this one. How is their friendship impacted once Tony comes out and owns 'I am Iron Man'?".

In Iron Man 3, Rhodes operates the redesigned/upgraded War Machine armor, taking on an American flag-inspired color scheme similar to the Iron Patriot armor from the comics. Feige said of Rhodes and the armor, "The notion in the movie is that a red, white and blue suit is a bold statement, and it's meant to be. With Rhodey, he's very much the foil to Tony's eccentricities, and in this one you get to see this and be reminded of the trust and friendship between them in that great Shane Black buddy-cop fashion." In the film, the president asks Rhodey to take up the moniker "Iron Patriot," and don the red, white, and blue suit, in order to be the government's "American hero" in response to the events in The Avengers.

Cheadle called Rhodes' appearance in Captain America: Civil War a "bit more intense and pivotal" compared to his previous appearances. Following his paralysis during the events of Civil War, Rhodes is given an apparatus by Stark to walk again, although according to Cheadle, in Avengers: Infinity War, Rhodes is reluctant to don his War Machine armor and rejoin the Avengers due to his injury. Cheadle believed that Rhodes is "negotiating this reunion and his rejoining this team". He also explained that Rhodes's relationship with Stark "deepened" from his accident, saying, "I think Tony feels somewhat responsible and culpable in a way. But again, he's always had my back in a way that only he could really have".

In Avengers: Endgame, Cheadle described Rhodes's newfound belonging as an Avenger as "not so much straddling one foot in the military. He's much more on the side of The Avengers than he was prior." This is reflected on Rhodes's more instinctive and realist worldview in the midst of encountering the fantastic, with Cheadle explaining, "He's definitely got some 'what-the-eff-is-happening' [attitude,] more than maybe the rest of them do, given his background. But it's a trial by fire, and he's quickly adapted to what [the threat] is, rather than what he wishes it were."

Appearances

Early screenplay drafts written by Alfred Gough, Miles Millar, and David Hayter for New Line Cinema, pitted Iron Man against his father Howard Stark, who becomes War Machine instead of Rhodes. Artist Phil Saunders had created concept art for an unused "hall of armor" scene in the film which included the War Machine armor.

 James Rhodes is introduced in Iron Man, and is portrayed by Terrence Howard.
 In Iron Man 2, Rhodes is under pressure from the United States government to convince Tony Stark to relinquish ownership of the Iron Man armor. When Stark drunkenly endangers civilian lives, Rhodes is forced to don an Iron Man suit to intervene during the confrontation to which Stark says: "You wanna be the War Machine, take your shot." Rhodes's borrowed armor is subsequently retrofitted by Justin Hammer with various weapon enhancements at an Air Force base, but the 'ex-wife' missile proves to be woefully below standards, and the War Machine armor itself is briefly taken over by remote control and used to attack Stark before Pepper Potts and Natasha Romanoff break the connection controlling him. Once freed, Rhodes fights alongside Stark to defeat Ivan Vanko.
 In Iron Man 3, Rhodes is promoted to full colonel and his armor is painted red, white, and blue. According to director Shane Black, the patriotic color scheme and name was chosen by the U.S. government in response to the events of The Avengers. Rhodes states that the U.S. government deemed "War Machine" to be too militaristic and that "Iron Patriot" tested well with focus groups. The armor is briefly stolen and used by Eric Savin to abduct President Ellis, but Rhodes is able to recover the armor at the film's conclusion and save the President.
 In Avengers: Age of Ultron, Rhodes operates the black and silver War Machine armor, aiding the Avengers in the final battle against Ultron, and joins the team with Vision, Sam Wilson, and Wanda Maximoff.
 In Captain America: Civil War, Rhodes sides with Stark when the Avengers are presented with the Sokovia Accords for the government to regulate their actions. This puts him at odds with Steve Rogers's team of Scott Lang, Clint Barton, Bucky Barnes, Maximoff, and Wilson. Stark's team of Rhodes, Romanoff, Peter Parker, Vision, and T'Challa confront Rogers’ team in Germany. However, Rhodes gets injured by Vision by accident and is paralyzed in his legs.
 In Avengers: Infinity War, Rhodes stands against Ross and the Sokovia Accords and goes with Rogers and the others to defend Vision in Wakanda. After Thanos completes the Infinity Gauntlet, Rhodes is one of the few survivors. 
 Rhodes appears in the mid-credits scene in Captain Marvel, along with Rogers, Romanoff, and Bruce Banner where they meet Carol Danvers.
 In Avengers: Endgame, Rhodes reunites with Stark and travels to space with the team to Thanos' garden planet to find out that he destroyed the Stones. In 2023, he travels via quantum realm with Nebula to Morag in an alternate timeline to get the Power Stone. After the Blip is reversed, an alternate version of Thanos arrives and attacks the Avengers Headquarters, causing Rhodes, Rocket, and Banner to be trapped, but they are rescued by Lang and then he joins the final fight against Thanos. Afterwards, Rhodes attends Stark's funeral.
 In The Falcon and the Winter Soldier, Rhodes attends a ceremony in Washington D.C., in which Wilson gives Rogers' shield to the U.S. government and talks with Wilson afterwards.
 An alternate timeline version of Rhodes appears in the Disney+ animated series What If...?.
 Rhodes will return and headline Armor Wars.

Fictional character biography
James Rupert "Rhodey" Rhodes served as an officer in the United States Air Force, for whom he flew 138 combat missions before becoming a liaison between the military's Department of Acquisitions and Stark Industries, where he became close friends with Tony Stark.

Assisting Iron Man

In 2009, when Stark is kidnapped by the Ten Rings, Rhodes personally leads the mission to rescue Stark. When the unidentified Iron Man armor encounters U.S. military aircraft, Rhodes deduces that it is Stark, and described the resulting damage to the press as the result of a training exercise. After Stark reveals his identity as Iron Man, Rhodes faces pressure from the United States Congress and the military to take possession of the armor for himself. In 2010, as Stark descends into reckless behavior, Rhodes feels he had no choice but to take the Mark II armor, handing it over to the military, for whom Justin Hammer upgrades it with new weapons to rebrand Rhodes as War Machine. Rhodes then helps Stark fend off an attack from Ivan Vanko and an army of Hammer Drones.

In 2012, Rhodes is rebranded as the Iron Patriot, working directly for the President of the United States, and is tasked with tracking down an enemy called the Mandarin. Rhodes discovers that the Mandarin is a ruse created by Aldrich Killian by hiring actor Trevor Slattery to portray the role. Killian captures Rhodes and steals the Iron Patriot Armor, using it to kidnap the president. Rhodes escapes, aiding Stark in fighting Killian's army of Extremis Soldiers, and rescuing the president.

New Avenger

Rhodes continues undertaking missions, and in 2015, he attends the Avengers' party at Avengers Tower, and later assists in their fight against Ultron in Sokovia. Afterwards, he is recruited to become a new member of the Avengers, alongside Wanda Maximoff, Vision, and Sam Wilson at the new Avengers Compound led by Steve Rogers and Natasha Romanoff.

In 2016, Rhodes is present at the Avengers Compound when U.S. Secretary of State Thaddeus Ross arrives and talks to the team about the Sokovia Accords. Rhodes agrees with Stark and signs the Accords. In Bucharest, he apprehends Rogers, Wilson, Bucky Barnes, and T'Challa. Later, he joins Stark, Romanoff, Peter Parker, T'Challa, and Vision to intercept Rogers, Barnes, Wilson, Clint Barton, Scott Lang, and Maximoff at Leipzig/Halle airport in Germany, where a fight ensues. After Rogers and Barnes escape on a Quinjet, Rhodes is accidentally hit by Vision whose blast incapacitates his suit, causing him to fall. Stark and Wilson are unable to catch him and he lands on the ground, fracturing his spinal column and leaving him paralyzed. He is taken to the medical facility at the Avengers Compound and is able to move slowly after Stark designed bionic supports for his legs as he underwent physical therapy.

By 2018, Rhodes has become disillusioned with the Accords, and disobeys orders from Ross to arrest Rogers, Romanoff, Wilson, and Maximoff after they return with Vision to the Avengers Compound. He then joins Rogers and the others to Wakanda, where he helps fight against the Outriders. When Thanos arrives, Rhodes is incapacitated after Thanos uses the Space Stone to stop his cannons. After Thanos completes the Infinity Gauntlet, Rhodes is one of the survivors, along with the original Avengers and Rocket. 
Shortly after returning to the Avengers Compound, Rhodes reports to Rogers and Romanoff that Fury's pager stopped transmitting a signal, but it was due to Carol Danvers's arrival.

Time Heist and aftermath

Three weeks later, Rhodes is reunited with Stark and joins Rogers, Romanoff, Banner, Thor, Rocket, Danvers, and Nebula into space to the Garden, where they confront Thanos, only to learn that he destroyed the Infinity Stones.

In 2023, Rhodes continues missions as an Avenger while keeping track of Barton's whereabouts and reporting back to Romanoff. After Stark and Lang devise a plan to time travel via the Quantum Realm, Rhodes returns to the Avengers Compound and goes with Nebula to an alternate 2014 timeline into space to the planet Morag. There they watch an alternate version of Peter Quill arrive. After knocking him out, they retrieve the Power Stone in the Orb. After Banner reverses the Blip, an alternate version of Thanos attacks the Avengers Compound and causes Rhodes, Rocket, and Banner to get trapped under rubble. Lang rescues them and Rhodes is able to participate in the battle against alternate Thanos and his army. After Stark sacrifices himself to win the battle, Rhodes is at Stark's side during his final moments, and later attends Stark's funeral.

In 2024, Rhodes attends a ceremony at the Smithsonian Institution where Wilson donates Rogers' shield to the museum, and the two catch up with each other.

Alternate versions 

An alternate version of Rhodes appears in the animated series What If...?, with Cheadle reprising his role.

Killmonger deception 

In an alternate 2009, Rhodes is sent to purchase vibranium from Stark's contact, Ulysses Klaue, for an army of combat drones that Stark and Erik "Killmonger" Stevens are designing. T'Challa ambushes the transaction, having been tipped off by Klaue at Killmonger's behest, but is killed by the latter. Killmonger then kills Rhodes as well, and frames both him and T'Challa for killing each other in order to spark conflict between the United States and Wakanda.

Reception
Jacob Stalworthy of The Independent was negative of the character, opining that the character was "Iron Man without backstory or humour".  However, Jeremy Schneider of NJ.com was more positive of the character and Cheadle's portrayal while highlighting the character being paralyzed in Captain America: Civil War as "one of the most poignant moments in the entire MCU".

For his 2008 performance, Howard was nominated for the Black Reel Award for Best Supporting Actor. For his 2021 appearance in The Falcon and the Winter Soldier, Cheadle was nominated for a Primetime Emmy Award for Outstanding Guest Actor in a Drama Series.

See also
War Machine in other media

References

External links
 James Rhodes on the Marvel Cinematic Universe Wiki
 
 James Rhodes on Marvel.com

African-American superheroes
American male characters in television
Avengers (film series)
Black characters in films
Fictional characters with paraplegia
Fictional colonels
Fictional cyborgs
Fictional genocide survivors
Fictional Massachusetts Institute of Technology people
Fictional military personnel in films
Fictional people from the 21st-century
Fictional United States Air Force personnel
Film characters introduced in 2008
Iron Man characters
Male characters in film
Male characters in television
Marvel Cinematic Universe characters
Marvel Comics male superheroes
Marvel Comics military personnel